Tibba Mehrban Shah , is a village and union council of Mianwali District in the Punjab province of Pakistan. It is located in Piplan Tehsil at 32°12'20N 71°18'20E.

References

Union councils of Mianwali District